Pultenaea pauciflora, commonly known as Narrogin pea, is a species of flowering plant in the family Fabaceae and is endemic to the south-west of Western Australia. It is a dense, erect, much-branched shrub with sickle-shaped leaves with a sharp point on the tip, and uniformly yellow flowers.

Description
The flowers are uniform yellow, borne singly or in pairs in leaf axils at the ends of the branchlets, and are sessile.

Taxonomy
Pultenaea pauciflora was first formally described in 1914 by Munro Briggs Scott in  Bulletin of Miscellaneous Information, Royal Gardens, Kew from specimens collected at the Narrogin Experiment Farm. The specific epithet, pauciflora, is derived from the Latin words, paucus (pauci-), meaning "few", and flos (floris) meaning "flower" to give a compound Botanical Latin adjective meaning "few-flowered" or "having few flowers".

Distribution and habitat
Narrogin pea grows in sandy soil in woodland in scattered populations, including near Narrogin, Boddington and Brookton, in the Avon Wheatbelt and Jarrah Forest biogeographic regions of south-western Western Australia.

Conservation status
Pultenaea ochreata is classified as "vulnerable" under the Australian Government Environment Protection and Biodiversity Conservation Act 1999 and as "Threatened Flora (Declared Rare Flora — Extant)" by the Department of Environment and Conservation (Western Australia).

References

External links
Pultenaea pauciflora Occurrence data from Australasian Virtual Herbarium

Fabales of Australia
Taxa named by Munro Briggs Scott
Flora of Western Australia
Plants described in 1914
pauciflora